The Comunidade Intermunicipal da Beira Baixa is an administrative division in eastern Portugal. It was created in October 2013 out of the former Comunidade Intermunicipal da Beira Interior Sul, created in March 2009. Since January 2015, Beira Baixa is also a NUTS3 subregion of Centro Region, that covers the same area as the intermunicipal community. The seat of the intermunicipal community is Castelo Branco. Beira Baixa comprises a large part of the Castelo Branco District. The population in 2011 was 89,063, in an area of 4,614.64 km².

Municipalities

The intermunicipal community of Beira Baixa consists of 6 municipalities:

References

External links

Official website CIM Beira Baixa

Intermunicipal communities of Portugal
Centro Region, Portugal